Viktor Evgenyevich Poletaev (born 27 July 1995) is a Russian volleyball player. He is a member of the Russia men's national volleyball team and Russian club Zenit Saint Petersburg.

Career

National team
In 2012–2013 he was a member of Russia men's national volleyball team U19. In 2013 he won with this team his first medal at European Championship U19 and he received individual award for Most Valuable Player. Then he achieved  a title of World Champion U19 and he was Best Opposite Spiker. In the same year he went to team Russia U21, where as 18 year old player achieved gold at World Championship U21 and title of Most valuable Player.
 In 2014 gained title of European Champion U21. In 2015 Poletaev went to senior team of Russia and took part in first senior tournament in his career – European Games 2015. He won with team mates bronze medal.

Sporting achievements

Clubs
 CEV Champions League
  2014/2015 – with Zenit Kazan
  2015/2016 – with Zenit Kazan
 FIVB Club World Championship
  Betim 2015 – with Zenit Kazan
 CEV Cup
  2020/2021 – with Zenit Saint Petersburg
 National championships
 2013/2014  Russian Championship, with Zenit Kazan
 2014/2015  Russian Cup, with Zenit Kazan
 2014/2015  Russian Championship, with Zenit Kazan
 2015/2016  Russian SuperCup, with Zenit Kazan
 2015/2016  Russian Cup, with Zenit Kazan
 2015/2016  Russian Championship, with Zenit Kazan
 2018/2019  Russian Championship, with Kuzbass Kemerovo
 2019/2020  Russian SuperCup, with Kuzbass Kemerovo

Youth national team
 2013  CEV U19 European Championship
 2013  FIVB U19 World Championship
 2013  FIVB U21 World Championship
 2014  CEV U20 European Championship

Individual awards
 2013: CEV U19 European Championship – Most Valuable Player
 2013: FIVB U19 World Championship – Best Opposite Spiker
 2013: FIVB U21 World Championship – Most Valuable Player

References

External links
 Player profile at CEV.eu
 Player profile at WorldofVolley.com
 Player profile at Volleybox.net

1995 births
Living people
Sportspeople from Chelyabinsk
Russian men's volleyball players
European Games medalists in volleyball
European Games bronze medalists for Russia
Volleyball players at the 2015 European Games
Volleyball players at the 2020 Summer Olympics
Olympic volleyball players of Russia
Medalists at the 2020 Summer Olympics
Olympic silver medalists for the Russian Olympic Committee athletes
Olympic medalists in volleyball
VC Zenit Kazan players
VC Zenit Saint Petersburg players